"With You" is a song by American singer Chris Brown for his second studio album, Exclusive (2007). The song was written by Brown, Johntá Austin, Espionage, and Stargate, the latter of which produced the song. The song was released as the album's third single on December 4, 2007, in the United States. It was later released internationally on March 21, 2008. "With You" is composed as a midtempo R&B ballad that features an acoustic guitar as the base of the arrangement.

"With You" topped the charts in New Zealand and peaked inside the top five in several countries. In the United States, "With You" peaked at number two on the Billboard Hot 100 and at number one on the US Pop Songs chart. The song is certified Quadruple Platinum in the US and Australia. The music video for "With You" was directed by Brown and Erik White. The video focuses more on Brown and his dance moves while utilizing several visual effects. It won the accolade for "Best Male Video" at the 2008 MTV Video Music Awards.

Background and release
"With You" was written by Brown, Johntá Austin, Mikkel S. Eriksen, Tor Erik Hermansen, Espen Lind, and Amund Bjørklund. Eriksen and Hermansen produced the song under their production stage-name Stargate. Eriksen recorded it at Battery Studios - a recording studio in New York. Phil Tan mixed the track with assistance from Josh Houghkirk at Soapbox Studio in Atlanta, Georgia. Eriksen and Hermansen, in addition to producing and writing, performed all the instruments featured on the song, with the exception of the guitar, which was provided by Lind.

"With You" was released as the third single from Brown's second studio album Exclusive (2007), after "Wall to Wall" and "Kiss Kiss" (2007). Before its official single release, the song was first released to digital retailers in certain territories on November 2, 2007, through Zomba Recordings, as a promotional single. More than a month later, on December 4, 2007, Jive Records and Zomba Recordings serviced the song to rhythmic crossover radio in the United States. They later solicited to contemporary hit radio on January 8, 2008. On March 4, 2008, an extended play for "With You" was released to digital retailers in certain countries, including the United States, featuring the original song and two other remixes by Tracy Young and Kovas. Another extended play was released in selected countries on March 14, 2008, containing the original version and four other remixes. On March 21, 2008, "With You" was released as a digital single in several countries, including Belgium, France, Ireland and Norway. The single featured a B-side, the B&B Remix of "With You".

Composition
 "With You" is a "folksy" R&B song. According to the music sheet published at Musicnotes.com by Sony/ATV Music Publishing, "With You" utilizes styles of urban and contemporary R&B music and has a moderate tempo of 86 beats per minute. It is written in a key of E♭ major while Brown's vocals range from E♭4 to B♭5 The song follows a basic sequence of E♭5-E♭maj7-A♭7-B♭ as its chord progression. It consists of a slow stuttering drum beat and an acoustic guitar arrangement that has garnered comparisons to that present in Stargate's other produced song, Beyoncé's 2006 hit "Irreplaceable". Kelefa Sanneh of New York Times said the song could be a cover of "Irreplaceable", while Nick Levine of Digital Spy called the two songs "kissing cousins". Greg Kot of the Chicago Tribune felt that the song "openly mimics "Irreplaceable" right down to the acoustic guitar riff."  Lyrically, "With You" is written about teenage love, presented in the lyrics "And now I know I can’t be the only one/ I bet there’s hearts all over the world tonight / With the love in their life who feel the way I feel when I’m with you."

Music video
The music video was shot in Los Angeles, California on November 20, 2007. It premiered on music video channels MTV, BET, and Fuse TV during the week of December 3, 2007. In a November 8, 2007, interview with MTV, Brown stated that he co-directed the video as well. "And it shows me more solo. Like, it shows the grown side of Chris – it doesn't show the kiddie side. 'Cause with this album, I wanted to blend, I wanted to do all different visuals of me. The first [video] 'Wall to Wall,' the acting, the vampires, the spookiness, then you go to 'Kiss, Kiss,' that had the little goofy part, now this one is solo, the main [performer] is me. Me freestyle dancing – just showing people me naturally, not a choreographed routine, just me dancing and showing you what I'm capable of. But at the same time, I was just having fun with the camera, and just one-on-one time with me and my audience." The video was quite popular in American television, reaching number 1 on BET's 106 & Park for 6 days, and staying on the countdown for 38 days. It has also reached number 1 on MTV TRL for 10 days, replacing Flo Rida's "Low" and finally retired at number 1 after it stayed on the countdown for 35 days. The music video won the accolade for "Best Male Video" at the 2008 MTV Video Music Awards.

Critical reception
Bill Lamb of About.com awarded a four and a half star rating, praising the song's instant warmth of the guitar-based arrangement, Brown's romantic vocals and as a perfect slow dance option. Lamb however disregarded its "simplistic swoony lyrics". He concluded his review, saying ""With You" helps prove that Chris Brown is not only an amazingly talented dancer, he can truly communicate to an audience vocally as well. Look for this song as a key choice at romantic events throughout 2008 and beyond." Erinn V. Westbrook of The Harvard Crimson wrote positively about the single, saying "It’s a bit sappy, but Brown comes off surprisingly genuine. If you’re like me, you may actually fall in love with the teenage vocalist."

Andy Kellman of Allmusic named it one of the album's highlights. Nick Levine of Digital Spy gave the song a three star rating, calling it a "pretty, folk-tinged R&B ballad" and commenting that "The lyrics won't be troubling the Ivor Novello judges any time soon ("With every kiss and every hug, you make me fall in love"), but its chorus is pretty enough to make us turn a deaf ear." Kelefa Sanneh of The New York Times commented that song borrows shamelessly from Beyonce's 2006 single "Irreplaceable". Norman Mayers of Prefix Magazine said that the ballads on Exclusive "suffer from lame, redundant, and derivative production", citing "With You" as an example, commenting that Stargate recycles Beyonce's "Irreplaceable". Sal Cinquemani of Slant Magazine commented that Stargate used the same formula for "Irreplaceable" on "With You", saying that it "is in serious need of replacing".

Chart performance
"With You" debuted at number 72 on the Billboard Hot 100 in the issue dated December 15, 2007, earning the biggest debut title for the week. In the song's seventh week, it entered the top ten tier of the chart, ascending from number twelve in the previous week to number six. Three weeks later, in the issue dated February 16, 2008, "With You" peaked at number two the Billboard Hot 100, where it remained for four consecutive weeks. On March 15, 2008, the song fell to number three, but ascended to number two the succeeding week, where it remained for another week, this time blocked by Usher's "Love in This Club" featuring Young Jeezy. The song also topped the US Radio Songs and the US Pop Songs charts as well as peaking at number five on the US Hot R&B/Hip-Hop Songs chart. It was certified platinum on April 24, 2008, by the Recording Industry Association of America (RIAA) for selling one million downloads. In Canada, "With You" entered the Canadian Hot 100 as the chart's highest debut at number 70 in the issue dated January 5, 2008. Ten weeks later, the song peaked at number two, where it remained for two weeks. On March 26, 2008, it was certified gold by Music Canada for selling 20,000 ringtones.

"With You" debuted on the Australian Singles Chart at number 24 on the issue dated March 16, 2008. The song quickly ascended the chart, reaching its peak at number five in its fifth week, where it remained for two weeks. "Kiss Kiss" was later certified double platinum by the Australian Recording Industry Association (ARIA) for shipping 140,000 copies. In New Zealand, the song entered the singles chart at number 25 on the issue dated December 17, 2007. Three weeks later, the song entered the top five, ascending to number four. In the issue dated February 18, 2008, "With You" topped the New Zealand Top 40, where it remained for four weeks. It remained on the chart for a total of twenty-three weeks. The song was certified platinum on March 16, 2008, by the Recording Industry Association of New Zealand (RIANZ). "With You" debuted on the UK Singles Chart at number 100 in the issue dated February 2, 2008. It eventually peaked at number eight on the week ending April 5, 2008, and remained on the singles chart for a total of thirty-six weeks. On August 22, 2008, "With You" was certified silver by the British Phonographic Industry (BPI) for selling 200,000 copies.

Track listings

Promotional single
 "With You" – 4:14

Three-track EP
 "With You" – 4:12
 "With You"  – 6:18
 "With You"  – 5:00

European CD single
 "With You" – 4:12
 "Fallen Angel" – 5:33

Five-track EP
 "With You"  – 4:12
 "With You"  – 3:45
 "With You"  – 3:51
 "With You"  – 6:18
 "With You"  – 5:00

Digital download
 "With You"  – 4:12
 "With You"  – 3:45

Credits
Credits are adapted from Exclusive liner notes, Jive Records, Zomba Recording.

Recording and mixing
 Recorded at Battery Studios in New York
 Mixed at Soapbox Studio in Atlanta, Georgia

Personnel
 Vocals – Chris Brown
 Songwriting – Chris Brown, Johntá Austin, Mikkel S. Eriksen, Tor Erik Hermansen, Espen Lind, Amund Bjørklund
 Production – Stargate
 Recording – Mikkel S. Eriksen
 Mixing – Phil Tan, assisted by Josh Houghkirk
 Guitar – Espen Lind
 All other instruments – Mikkel S. Eriksen, Tor Erik Hermansen
 Stargate management – Tim Blacksmith, Danny D

Charts

Weekly charts

Year-end charts

Certifications

Radio and release history

See also
 List of number-one singles from the 2000s (New Zealand)
 List of Billboard Rhythmic number-one songs of the 2000s
 List of Hot 100 Airplay number-one singles of the 2000s

References

2007 singles
Chris Brown songs
Number-one singles in New Zealand
Number-one singles in Turkey
Songs written by Johntá Austin
Songs written by Espen Lind
Songs written by Amund Bjørklund
Songs written by Tor Erik Hermansen
Songs written by Mikkel Storleer Eriksen
Pop ballads
Contemporary R&B ballads
Music videos directed by Erik White
MTV Video Music Award for Best Male Video
Song recordings produced by Stargate (record producers)
2007 songs
Jive Records singles
2000s ballads